Sarhan Guliev (born 1 April 1968) is an Azerbaijani chess player who holds the title of Grandmaster (GM). He earned the International Master (IM) title in 1993 and the Grandmaster title in 1995. He was a member of the Azerbaijan Chess Olympiad team in 1994 and 1998.

References

1968 births
Living people
Chess International Masters
Chess grandmasters
Chess Olympiad competitors
People from Qubadli District